CCGS Amundsen is a  and Arctic research vessel operated by the Canadian Coast Guard. The vessel entered service in 1979 as Franklin and was renamed Sir John Franklin in 1980 and served as such until 1996. Declared surplus, the vessel was used as an accommodation ship in Labrador in 1996 and placed in reserve in 2000. In 2003, the ship was reactivated and underwent conversion to an Arctic research vessel. The ship recommissioned as Amundsen.

Design and description
The Pierre Radisson class were designed for Coast Guard operations in the Arctic Ocean. The vessel has a gross tonnage of 5,911 and a net tonnage of 1,678.

The vessel is propelled by two fixed-pitch propellers and one bow thruster powered by a diesel-electric system comprising six Alco M251F diesel engines that when driving the shafts create  and six GEC generators creating 11.1 megawatts sustained powering two motors that when driving the shafts create . Amundsen is also equipped with one Caterpillar 398 emergency generator.

Amundsen is equipped with a Sperry navigational radar operating on the E/F and I bands. The icebreaker has a flight deck and hangar which originally accommodated a MBB Bo 105 or Bell 206L light helicopter, but currently supports the Bell 429 GlobalRanger and Bell 412EPI which were acquired by the Canadian Coast Guard in the 2010s to replace the older helicopters. The vessel is certified as Arctic Class 3 and has a complement of 31 with 11 officers and 20 crew. Amundsen has an additional 51 berths.

Operational history
The ship's keel was laid down 4 January 1977 by Burrard Dry Dock at their yard in North Vancouver, British Columbia with the yard number 222. The ship was launched on 10 March 1978 and entered in Coast Guard service in March 1979. The ship was named Franklin in honour of Arctic explorer Sir John Franklin. After completing the vessel performed sea trials in the western Arctic and Northwest Passage. The two ships then transited to the East Coast of Canada via the Panama Canal. In 1980, the vessel was renamed to Sir John Franklin at the request of the crew. The ship worked out of CCG Base Dartmouth and CCG Base Quebec City for most of the 1980s and 1990s, being tasked to winter icebreaking operations in the Gulf of St. Lawrence and St. Lawrence River and off Newfoundland. During the summer season, Sir John Franklin was often tasked to support the annual Arctic Summer Sealift operation for escorting cargo ships to remote port communities in the Canadian Arctic Archipelago.

In 1981, Sir John Franklin was used to test Coast Guard procedures in the oil spill exercise called "Baffin Island Oil Spill".  In 1987, the ship escorted the Arctic cargo ship/oil tanker  to Nanisivik. In July 1989, the icebreaker again attempted to transit the Northwest Passage but was forced to break off the attempt after ice conditions were found to be too severe. In June 1994, at the height of the Turbot War, Sir John Franklin was among the Coast Guard vessels sent to monitor the European fishing fleets on the Grand Banks. The ship was kept just out of sight but within radar range of foreign fishing trawlers. These actions led to the detainment and seizure of the Spanish fishing trawler Estai.

Decommissioning
Following the 1995 transfer of the Canadian Coast Guard from the Department of Transport to the Department of Fisheries and Oceans, Sir John Franklin was deemed surplus to the fleet in 1996. That summer, she was contracted to Newfoundland-based shipping company Canship for use as an accommodations vessel during exploration work at a coastal nickel deposit at Voisey's Bay in northern Labrador. She was subsequently decommissioned from the Canadian Coast Guard in 2000 and placed in non-operational reserve.

Conversion to Arctic research vessel

In 2001, the Canadian Coast Guard announced that it could not provide an icebreaker for research purposes in the Arctic that year. This led to several scientific groups looking for a possible replacement.
In 2002, a consortium of Canadian universities and federal departments submitted a proposal to convert Sir John Franklin into an Arctic Ocean research vessel. The proposal was accepted and the ship given new life in August 2003 after funding was received for the new dedicated research vessel. The total cost for the refit was CAN$30.7 million with $27.7 million provided by the Canadian Foundation for Innovation and $3 million provided by the Department of Fisheries and Oceans.

The ship was towed from St. John's, Newfoundland and Labrador and underwent the 10-month conversion of Sir John Franklin at a shipyard in Les Mechins, Quebec. There, part of the vessel's storage holds were transformed into laboratory space. The refit included the addition of a moon pool, which enables scientists to lower scientific instruments from inside the hull without cutting a hole in the ice, multi-beam sonar, the replacement of heating and electrical systems, and installation of state-of-the-art scientific equipment. The vessel was recommissioned into the Canadian Coast Guard as Amundsen, named in honour of Arctic explorer Roald Amundsen, on 26 August 2003. Amundsens sponsor was Lily Schreyer, the sponsor of Franklin when the vessel first entered service. The ship remained the property of the Canadian Coast Guard and continues to support Coast Guard functions but is the dedicated science platform for scientists in the Arctic.

Return to service
Shortly after re-entering service, Amundsen began its career as a research vessel, departing for King William Sound. The ship remained in the Arctic for 398 days, split over two missions, an expedition to the Beaufort Sea and the other in support of Inuit communities in Nunavik. In 2004, Amundsen became the first Canadian vessel to offer hospital services to the Aboriginal peoples living in remote locations in Canada's north since the controversial  was taken out of service in 1970. The ship supports ArcticNet's marine-based research program. In July 2007, Amundsen departed for a 15-month expedition to the Canadian Arctic to work on several projects. In 2009, the ship was sent to collect new environmental data in the Beaufort Sea in co-operation with the oil exploitation sector. In August 2010, Amundsen responded to 27 August grounding of the cruise liner Clipper Adventurer in the Coronation Gulf. Arriving on 29 August, the icebreaker took off the 120 passengers and crew and brought them to Kugluktuk, arriving on 30 August.

In 2011, it was announced that an image of the vessel would be placed on the backside of the new Canadian 50 Dollar polymer banknote. This was intended to mark Canada's northern frontier and arctic research. In December 2011 a routine maintenance inspection discovered dangerous cracking in four of her six engines. The engines required immediate replacement, and she was unavailable throughout 2012. Amundsen departed on 26 July 2013 for deployment in the Arctic.

The helicopter attached to Amundsen crashed in the Arctic on 9 September 2013, with a loss of three lives, including the commander, the helicopter pilot and an academic from the University of Manitoba. In July 2015, Amundsen was redirected from a 115-day science cruise to northern Baffin Bay to aid resupply ships for northern communities which were navigating heavy ice in Hudson Bay.

On 24 August 2018, Amundsen was directed to assist , a research vessel that had run aground in the western Gulf of Boothia. Once on the scene, Amundsen and her helicopter were used to transfer passengers from the research vessel to Akademik Ioffes sister ship .

References

Notes

Citations

Sources

External links

 http://www.amundsen.ulaval.ca/home.php# 

Pierre Radisson-class icebreakers
Research vessels of Canada
Arctic research
Ships built in British Columbia
1979 ships